Dalawa Man ang Buhay Mo, Pagsasabayin Ko is a 1991 Philippine action film co-written and directed by Willy Milan. The film stars Ronnie Ricketts on dual roles.

The film marks First Films' first venture into local production after distribution of Hong Kong-based action movies to the Philippines.

Plot
Sonny Boy (Ricketts) and his father Rafael (Alvarez) team up to avenge the murder of his twin brother Robert (Ricketts).

Cast
 Ronnie Ricketts as Robert / Sonny Boy
 Mark Gil as Alex
 Rina Reyes as Mae Ann
 Roy Alvarez as Rafael
 Marissa Delgado as Aida
 Juan Rodrigo as Ruben

References

External links

1991 films
1991 action films
Filipino-language films
Philippine action films
First Films films
Films directed by Willy Milan